Pinkvilla is an Indian entertainment and lifestyle platform. As of June 2022, Pinkvilla has over 5,00,00,000 visitors on its website and app.

Overview 
Pinkvilla covers entertainment and lifestyle stories. Its coverage extends to Bollywood, Hollywood, South Cinema, and Korean entertainment as well as fashion, food, travel, health, and many others. Comscore revealed that Pinkvilla was the top entertainment portal in India for March 2019.

History
Launched in May 2007, Pinkvilla was founded by Nandini Shenoy, who formally worked at Microsoft as a software engineer.

The site initially operated solely from the US with no connections to Indian media. Nandini formed a network of photographers to work with Pinkvilla, allowing the platform to gain readers in 2009 when some photos of Sonam Kapoor went viral. In 2013, Pinkvilla formed its first editorial team in Mumbai, setting up its first office in 2015.

In 2020, the platform recorded more than 30 million unique monthly visitors. In the same year, it also announced the launch of its two new Pinkvilla properties, "HallyuTalk" and "Pinkvilla Rooms". HallyuTalk is the first Korean entertainment platform launched extensively in the country. In 2021, international box office analyst Jatinder Singh joined the Pinkvilla editorial team.

Sub-verticals 

 Pinkvilla South
 Pinkvilla Telly
 Pinkvilla Fashion
 Pinkvilla USA
 Pinkvilla Rooms
 HindiRush
 Pinkvilla Telugu
 HallyuTalk

Events 
The platform Pinkvilla’s first event collaboration was with Lux, for the Lux Golden Rose Awards in 2018. In 2022, Pinkvilla witnessed two large-scale events, Pinkvilla Style Icons and HallyuTalk Awards. Pinkvilla Style Icons is the first independent on-ground event for Pinkvilla. Its first edition was held on 16 June 2022 and marked fifteen years in business for the brand.

The HallyuTalk awards was India's first awards show to recognize Korean entertainment at a large scale, garnering a reach of over 275 million.

References

External links 
 

Online magazines published in India
2007 establishments in India
Film magazines published in India
Hindi-language magazines
Telugu-language magazines